Toma Gheorghe Barbu Socolescu a Romanian architect, son of Toma T. Socolescu and grandson of Toma N. Socolescu, functionalist in spite of himself, he had to espouse the directives of the Socialist Republic of Romania.

Biography 

Architecture graduate of the École nationale supérieure des Beaux-Arts in 1939,  Socolescu is one of the architects that worked during the time of its studies on the interior of the transatlantic liner SS Normandie, between 1932 an 1935.

Initially a university assistant at the Ion Mincu Architecture Institute (Bucharest) from 1939 to 1951, he would pursue his career in industrial architecture and large civil buildings. 

From 1942 to 1945, he was Design Architect at the CAM (Cassa Autonoma a Monopolurilor Regatului României), a position he would still assume from 1949 to 1951 at the IPC (Institute of Design and Construction). He became Chief Designer Architect at the Design Institute for Industrial Constructions (IPCI) until 1952.

From 1952 to 1958, he served as Chief Architect Designer at the Design Institute dor Oil Refineries  IPIP SA).

From 1960-1967, he acted as Architect Advisor at the Architecture and Buildings Design Institute for Food Industries & Consumers Cooperative Societies.

He ended his career as a professor at the Technical School of Architecture and Town Building from 1967 to 1969

Barbu Socolescu  designed many civil and industrial buildings, including a Pepsi-Cola plant in 1966.

Painter, he exhibited his watercolors in an exhibition organized by the Union of Architects of the Socialist Republic of Romania in Bucharest in 1954.

Contests 

 1937: First prize for the sketch competition for a casino project for the Astra Română refinery, in Ploiești, co-directed with his father Toma T. Socolescu - Ploiești.
 April 1938: 1st mention at concours Paul Delaon - Paris.
 1964: Award of the Architecture and Building State Commission for the canned vegetables factory of Ovidiu, Constanţa - Romania.

Memberships 

He was a member of several groups of architects:
 Member of the Association of students and former students of the National and Superior School of Fine Arts or Grande Masse of the School of Fine Arts in 1932.
 Société des Architectes Diplômés par le Gouvernement Français since 1939.
 Society of Certified Architects and Corporation of Romanian Architects in 1939.
 Society of Romanian Architects from 1939 to 1946.
 Architects Union of Romanian Socialist Republic since 1953.

Architectural achievements 

 Interior decoration of the liner SS Normandie in 1936, under the direction of professor of architecture Roger-Henri Expert.

 Villa of Dr Gheorghiu à Breaza, Prahova County en 1940.
 Slănic Salt Mine Employee Housing Building (Salina Slănic), Prahova County in 1942.
 Social complex and canteen of the municipality of Ghimpați, Giurgiu County, in 1942.
 Tobacco manufacturing and fermentation warehouse from the Autonomous Fund of Monopolies of the Kingdom of Romania (CAM) in Râmnicu Sărat and Târgu Jiu, in 1943.
 Salt deposit at Ocna Mureș, Alba County, in 1943.
 Administrative premises, staff accommodation and warehouses from the Autonomous Fund of Monopolies of the Kingdom of Romania (CAM)in Fălticeni, Suceava County, in 1943.
 Oil factory in Craiova, as an external collaborator at the Ministry of Communal Economy and Local Industry, in 1949.
 cement plant of Bicaz, 1951.
 Various works for the Medgidia and Fieni cement plants: mechanical workshop, cement paste tank, canteen, administrative pavilion, in 1951
 Many other industrial constructions until 1966, including a vegetable canning factory in Ovidiu near Constanța.

Architectural projects 

 Astra Refinery Casino, Ploieşti, carried out with his father Toma T. Socolescu, in 1937.
 Orthodox Church of Prédeal in 1956 or 1957, another project carried out with his father Toma T. Socolescu.

Sources 
 Socolescu family's archives (Paris, Bucharest) including a photographic collection.
  Ion Mincu Architecture and Urbanism University Library, Bucharest.
  | Central University Library Carol I, Bucharest
  Revista Arhitectura, journal published by the Society of Architects of Romania from 1906 to 1944. Most issues are available at the Central University Library Carol I .
  UAR Archives (Union of Architects of Romania) - UAR documentary archives (available on site on request).
  Archives of the Paris School of Fine Arts / AGORHA - Plateforme de données de la recherche de l'Institut national d'histoire de l'art / Dictionnaire des élèves architectes de l’École des beaux-arts de Paris (1800-1968)  Dictionary database, Paris.
 International Who's who in Art and Antiques - Second Edition, Ernest Kay (Directeur Editorial), Great Britain, Melrose Press Ltd, 1976, 525 pages,

Related articles and links 

  Technical College of Architecture and Public Works Ioan N. Socolescu.

Notes and references 

Romanian architects
1977 deaths
1910 births
20th-century Romanian architects